The 2015 Southland Conference tournament was held at Lady Demon Diamond on the campus of Northwestern State University in Natchitoches, Louisiana, from May 6 through May 8, 2015. The tournament winner, Central Arkansas earned the Southland Conference's automatic bid to the 2015 NCAA Division I softball tournament. The Championship game was broadcast on ESPN3 with the remainder of the tournament airing on the Southland Digital Network.

Format
The top 6 teams qualify for the Southland softball tournament. Abilene Christian and Incarnate Word are currently ineligible due to their transition from D2 to D1. Had either of the two teams been in the top 6 spots, the seventh and if necessary eighth teams would have qualified for the tournament and would have taken their respective spots.

Tournament

All times listed are Central Daylight Time.

Line Scores

Day One

Game 1 (Texas A&M-Corpus Christi vs Central Arkansas)

Game 2 (Lamar vs Southeastern Louisiana)

Game 3 (Central Arkansas vs McNeese State)

Game 4 (Lamar vs Northwestern State)

Day Two

Game 5 (Northwestern State vs Texas A&M-Corpus Christi)

Game 6 (Southeastern Louisiana vs McNeese State)

Game 7 (Central Arkansas vs Lamar)

Semi-final Game One (Southeastern Louisiana vs Northwestern State)

Day Three

Semi-final Game Two (Northwestern State vs Lamar)

Championship Game (Northwestern State vs Central Arkansas)

Awards and honors
Source:  

Tournament MVP: Kylee Studioso – Central Arkansas

All-Tournament Teams:

 Sarah Bigej – Central Arkansas
 Sam Forrest – Central Arkansas
 Jessie Taylor – Central Arkansas
 Brianna Whisenhunt – Central Arkansas
 Micayla Sorosiak – Northwestern State
 Kellye Kincannon – Northwestern State
 Sarah Ragsdale – Lamar
 Laura Napoli – Lamar
 Katie Lacour – Southeastern Louisiana
 Spencer Adkinson – Southeastern Louisiana

See also
2015 Southland Conference baseball tournament

References

Southland Conference softball tournament
Tournament